Gelora Bandung Lautan Api Stadium (literally meaning "Bandung Sea of Fire Sports Stadium") is a stadium in Gedebage subdistrict, Bandung, West Java, Indonesia.

Funding
The initial agreement between the provincial government had an MoU with the Bandung City Government in 2008, with agreed proportion of 60% funding from the provincial government. Therefore, the stadium will be owned by the provincial government. In recent developments, with the MoU signed 27 December 2009, the whole funding is from the city government and the stadium would be owned by the city government. However, the West Java provincial government would help via the financial aid budget (Bankeu) for 3 years.

Facilities
The stadium's design adheres to the international standards for stadium design. The grass used is Zoysia matrella (Linn) Merr which is of FIFA standard class. The stadium is equipped with; a football pitch, athletics track, offices, big screen and fireproof seats from Ferco Seating. The stadium is completed with 38,000 individual seats.
The stadium has four storey with an area of 72,000 square meters, combined with other supporting facilities with total of 40 hectares. It also has a total of 766 toilets, a VIP box with bulletproof glass, and a helicopter pad.

Incidents

Killing of Haringga Sirla
A tragic incident happened on 23 September 2018, when before a match between Persija Jakarta and Persib, one of the Jakmania (Persija fans) members, Haringga Sirla, was killed by some unscrupulous Persib fans. Condolences for Haringga also flowed from netizens throughout social media. In response to the incident, the Football Association of Indonesia forced Persib to pay a IDR 100 million (US$6,634) fine and play the remainder of their home matches of the 2018 season behind closed doors.

2022 crowd incident

On 17 June 2022, at least two people were killed in a crowd crush at the stadium's entrance. The incident occcured as fans were attempting to enter the stadium to watch a match between Persib and Persebaya Surabaya in the 2022 President's Cup group stage. For the match, Persib provided only 15,000 tickets as a result of a management agreement with the local police, however, the stadium was full of both teams' supporters. Police stated that the two victims had suffocated while entering the stadium as many fans rushed the gate and squeezed each other. Both victims were given treatment by local officials before being transferred to the Sartika Asih Hospital. Persib officially confirmed the incident by posting a condolence on their social media and attending the funeral of the victim. In response to the event, the PSSI, via their website, released that they will investigate the incident. On social media, the Bobotoh (Persib's fans) accused the match officials as the root of the problem for terrible crowd management.

International matches hosted

Sport events
 2017 Liga 2 semi-finals and final.
 2018 Indonesia President's Cup
 2022 Indonesia President's Cup

References

See also
 List of stadiums by capacity

Persib Bandung
Bandung
Buildings and structures in Bandung
Sports venues in Indonesia
Athletics (track and field) venues in Indonesia
Multi-purpose stadiums in Indonesia
Football venues in Indonesia
Sports venues in West Java
Multi-purpose stadiums in West Java
Football venues in West Java
Athletics (track and field) venues in West Java
Sports venues in Bandung
Multi-purpose stadiums in Bandung
Football venues in Bandung
Athletics (track and field) venues in Bandung
Buildings and structures in West Java
Sport in West Java
Sports venues completed in 2013